Radoslava Topalova (born 1 September 1980) is a former professional tennis player from Bulgaria.

Topalova played doubles in three Fed Cup ties for Bulgaria, one in 2001 and two in 2002.

She is the younger sister of tennis player Desislava Topalova.

ITF Circuit finals

Doubles: 4 (3 titles, 1 runner–up)

References

External links
 
 
 

1980 births
Living people
Bulgarian female tennis players